Gustaf Hjalmar Malmström (4 July 1884 – 24 December 1970) was a lightweight Greco-Roman wrestler from Sweden. He competed at the 1908 and 1912 Summer Olympics and finished in fifth and second place, respectively. Earlier he won a silver medal at the 1911 World Championships and two gold medals at the 1907 and 1909 unofficial European championships.

References

External links
 

1884 births
1970 deaths
Wrestlers at the 1908 Summer Olympics
Wrestlers at the 1912 Summer Olympics
Swedish male sport wrestlers
Olympic wrestlers of Sweden
Olympic silver medalists for Sweden
Olympic medalists in wrestling
Sportspeople from Malmö
Medalists at the 1912 Summer Olympics
World Wrestling Championships medalists